The Boys: The Sherman Brothers' Story is a 2009 American documentary film about the Sherman Brothers (Richard M. and Robert B.) The film is directed and produced by their sons, Gregory V. Sherman and Jeff Sherman, and released through Walt Disney Pictures. Ben Stiller acted as executive producer for the film.

Content
The film deals with professional growth and estrangement between the Academy Award-winning music composing team through the years, who are best known for their up-beat Disney music. It contains interviews with family members and several individuals in the film industry, including actors such as Julie Andrews and Dick Van Dyke (who worked with the Sherman Brothers on Mary Poppins), producers (Roy E. Disney), fellow film composers (John Williams and Stephen Schwartz) and film critics (Leonard Maltin).

Cast

 Richard M. Sherman
 Robert B. Sherman
 Roy E. Disney
 Julie Andrews
 Dick Van Dyke
 John Williams
 Stephen Schwartz
 Leonard Maltin
 Debbie Reynolds
 Hayley Mills
 Alan Menken
 Randy Newman
 John Lasseter
 John Landis
 Karen Dotrice
 Samuel Goldwyn, Jr.
 Micky Dolenz
 Kenny Loggins
 Robert Osborne
 Tony Walton
 Cameron Mackintosh
 Ben Stiller
 Jon Turteltaub
 Lesley Ann Warren
 Johnny Whitaker
 Maury Yeston
 Will Smith
 Linda Ercoli
 A. J. Carothers
 Guy Pohlman

Release
The film premiered at the 2009 San Francisco Film Festival and the Newport Beach Film Festival in April 2009. It opened to limited release (three theaters) on 22 May 2009: the Metreon in San Francisco, the Landmark Sunshine Cinema in New York City, and the Landmark Regent Theatre in Los Angeles.

Critical reception
The Boys: the Sherman Brothers' Story received overall positive early reviews from both Disneyana fans, and mainstream media outlets. Rotten Tomatoes gives it a freshness rating of 89%. The New York Times called it "an irresistible documentary portrait of the brothers made by their sons". USA Today gave it three stars (out of four), stating it was "...a fascinating love story and moving tribute to Disney films, the joys of making music, the bonds of family and enduring partnerships." The San Francisco Chronicle called the film "an excellent film - entertaining and informative and sometimes stunning in its display of the personal demons shared by these two geniuses. "The Boys" is a loving tribute, but it's also like watching the plot of a William Faulkner novel played out in the middle of Disneyland."

While The Hollywood Reporter praised the film, it believed that the box office potential was modest, as the film would only appeal to "film buffs, Disneyphiles and fans of wholesome film musicals."

Box office
In its first weekend of release (May 22–24, 2009), it grossed $14,682 on five screens, with an estimated $2,292 per screen.

References

External links
 
 
 
 
 
 WDW Radio interview with Richard M. Sherman
 Article about the film from The San Francisco Chronicle
 Q: The Podcast for Thursday, 13 August 2009 Interview with Richard Sherman and producers Gregory Sherman and Jeff Sherman

Sherman Brothers
2009 films
2009 documentary films
American documentary films
Documentary films about music and musicians
Disney documentary films
Films about Disney
Walt Disney Pictures films
Red Hour Productions films
Works about Walt Disney
2000s English-language films
2000s American films